Robert Bickle (March 27, 1929 – May 28, 1974) was an American boxer. He competed in the men's lightweight event at the 1952 Summer Olympics. At the 1952 Summer Olympics, he defeated Basil Henricus of Ceylon, before losing to Aureliano Bolognesi of Italy.

References

1929 births
1974 deaths
American male boxers
Olympic boxers of the United States
Boxers at the 1952 Summer Olympics
People from Hoisington, Kansas
Boxers from Kansas
Lightweight boxers